Exoclimenella is a genus of shrimps belonging to the family Palaemonidae.

The species of this genus are found in Madagascar, Arabian Peninsula, Pacific Ocean.

Species:

Exoclimenella denticulata 
Exoclimenella maldivensis 
Exoclimenella sibogae 
Exoclimenella sudanensis

References

Palaemonidae